Sheila Clayton (born 19 July 1951) is a British former swimmer. She competed in the women's 400 metre freestyle at the 1968 Summer Olympics.

References

1951 births
Living people
British female swimmers
Olympic swimmers of Great Britain
Swimmers at the 1968 Summer Olympics
Sportspeople from London
British female freestyle swimmers
20th-century British women